Soros (Greek: Σωρός) is an islet in the Echinades, one of the Ionian Islands in Greece. As of 2011, it had no resident population.

References

Echinades
Islands of the Ionian Islands (region)
Islands of Greece
Landforms of Cephalonia